The Egyptian Basketball Super League Most Valuable Player Award (MVP) is an annual Egyptian Basketball Super League award given since the 2018–19 season to the best player of a given season. As of the 2020–21 season, the current holder of the award is Anas Mahmoud of Zamalek.

Winners

References

Basketball most valuable player awards
Egyptian Basketball Super League